Dinagat can refer to:

Places in the Philippines
 Dinagat Islands, a province in the Philippines
 Dinagat Island, primary/main island of the province
 Dinagat, Dinagat Islands, a municipality in the province
 Dinagat Sound, body of water between the islands of Dinagat and Siargao

See also
 Dumagat (disambiguation)